Shalom-Avraham Shaki (born 1906, died 4 November 1990) was an Israeli politician who served as a member of the Knesset for the National Religious Party between 1962 and 1965.

Biography
Born in Yemen in the Ottoman Empire, Shaki made aliyah to Palestine in 1914. He was educated at a religious school and college, before attending a religious teachers' seminary. He also studied at the Institute for Middle Eastern Studies at the Hebrew University of Jerusalem.

In 1929 he began working as a teacher in Hadera, before switching to Tel Aviv the following year, where he worked until 1951. Between 1950 and 1951 he was headmaster of a religious school in a Yemenite ma'abara in Ein Shemer. From 1952 until 1963 he was headmaster of a school in Bnei Brak.

A member of Hapoel HaMizrachi and, from 1956, the National Religious Party, Shaki was on the party's list for the 1961 elections. Although he failed to win a seat, he entered the Knesset on 8 November 1962 as a replacement for the deceased Mordechai Nurock. However, he lost his seat in the 1965 elections.

His daughter, Tehila, is the wife of Breslov rosh yeshiva Eliezer Berland. He died in 1990.

References

External links

1906 births
1990 deaths
20th-century Israeli educators
Hapoel HaMizrachi politicians
Hebrew University of Jerusalem alumni
20th-century Israeli Jews
Israeli people of Yemeni-Jewish descent
Jewish Israeli politicians
Jews in Mandatory Palestine
Jews in Ottoman Palestine
Members of the 5th Knesset (1961–1965)
National Religious Party politicians
Yemenite Jews
Yemenite Jews in Israel